Wien Atzgersdorf is a railway station serving Atzgersdorf in the 23rd District of Vienna.

References 

Railway stations in Vienna
Austrian Federal Railways